Gawronki may refer to the following places in Poland:
Gawronki, Lower Silesian Voivodeship (south-west Poland)
Gawronki, Łódź Voivodeship (central Poland)